Mrauk-U District is a newly created district in Rakhine State, Burma (Myanmar); which was formerly part of Sittwe District. Its administrative center is the city of Mrauk-U.

25 mountains have been officially named in Mrauk-U. Kema Taung is the highest place in this District. Yulin Jung is the most prominent mountain.

Administrative divisions
Mrauk-U District consists of the following townships:

 Kyauktaw Township
 Mrauk-U Township
 Minbya Township
 Myebon Township

Notes

Districts of Myanmar
Rakhine State